Seven ships of the Royal Navy have borne the name HMS Bittern, after the bird, the bittern:

 was an 18-gun sloop launched in 1796 and sold in 1833.
 was a 12-gun brig launched in 1840 and sold in 1860.
HMS Bittern (1861) was to have been a wood screw sloop.  She was ordered in 1861, but construction was cancelled in 1864.
 was a wood screw gunvessel launched in 1869 and sold in 1887.
 was an  launched in 1897 and sunk in a collision in 1918.
HMS Bittern was to have been a  sloop, but she was renamed  before her launch.
 was a Bittern-class sloop, launched in 1937 and sunk in 1940.

Royal Navy ship names